Ozatlán is a municipality in the Usulután department of El Salvador.

The city of Ozatlán was named in the 1970s by the governor of El Salvador.  This city was recently rebuilt, with a new central park and business district.

Municipalities of the Usulután Department